Friedrich Wohnsiedler (23 November 1879 – 10 February 1958) was a New Zealand butcher, orchardist, viticulturist and wine-maker. He was born in Eberbach-am-Jagst, Germany in 1879. He arrived in New Zealand around 1900 and worked as a butcher, first in Lower Hutt, then Woodville, eventually settling in Gisborne. He fled from Gisborne in 1914 due to anti-German feelings, and later settled in Waihirere in the Hawke's Bay Region, where he started with viticulture.

References

1879 births
1958 deaths
German emigrants to New Zealand
German viticulturists
New Zealand butchers
New Zealand winemakers
New Zealand orchardists